Joseph Zhang Weizhu (born 1967) is a Chinese Catholic priest and Bishop of the Roman Catholic Diocese of Xinxiang from 1992.

Biography
Zhang was ordained a priest in 1985.

In February 1998 he was appointed Bishop of the Roman Catholic Diocese of Xinxiang by the Pope.

On May 21, 2021, Bishop Zhang Weizhu was arrested; the day before, seven priests and ten seminarians had been arrested.

On May 20, 2021 in the early afternoon, about 100 policemen from Hebei province - from Cangzhou, Hejian and Shaheqiao - surrounded the building that is used as a diocesan seminary in Shaheqiao, Hebei. Indeed, Xinxiang used as a seminary a small factory owned by a Hebei Catholic. The police entered the building and detained four priests, seminary professors, and three other priests who carry out pastoral work. Together with them they arrested 10 seminarians who were attending class at the factory.

Following the directives of the New Regulation on religious activities, the factory was closed and the director of the company was arrested.

Xinxiang Apostolic Prefecture is not recognized by the Chinese government. For this reason, all the activities of priests, seminarians and faithful are considered "illegal" and "criminal."

After the raid, the police seized all the personal effects of the priests and seminarians.

Given the huge deployment of police forces, the raid is believed to have been planned for a long time. The civil authorities believe that there are more seminarians who managed to escape and are looking for them in the area.

Public safety and police go house to house to find them. If they discover that there are signs related to the Catholic faith (crosses, statues, sacred images, photographs of the Pope, etc.), they kidnap and destroy the objects and fine the owners.

According to many observers, since the interim agreement between China and the Holy See was signed, the persecution against Catholics, especially the unofficial ones, has increased. The Agreement only refers to the appointment of new bishops, but the premise of it was that the rest of the Church's situation would remain on hold until the problems could be addressed through dialogue between the two parties. On the contrary, the police forces have placed bishops under house arrest, imposed very high fines on the faithful, expelled parish priests from churches and arrested priests and seminarians. Many faithful consider that "the Agreement has been betrayed".

Archbishop Joseph Zhang Weizhu, 63, was ordained a bishop in 1991 and was imprisoned several times. The Xinxiang Apostolic Prefecture has 100,000 faithful.

References

General references
www.infocatolica.com
www.asianews.it

External links
 Krótka biografia na ''GCatholic.org (en) 

1967 births
Living people
21st-century Roman Catholic bishops in China
20th-century Roman Catholic bishops in China